Ye Huanming is a male Chinese weightlifter. He competed at 1988 Seoul Olympics, and won a bronze medal in Men's 56–60 kg (featherweight). His final score was 287.5 kg.

References

Chinese male weightlifters
Olympic weightlifters of China
Weightlifters at the 1988 Summer Olympics
Olympic bronze medalists for China
Living people
Olympic medalists in weightlifting
Medalists at the 1988 Summer Olympics
Year of birth missing (living people)
20th-century Chinese people